Bandar Rig (also Romanized as Bandar Rīg and Bandar-e Rīg; also known simply as Rig) is a city in Rig District of Ganaveh County, Bushehr province, Iran. At the 2006 census, its population was 5,257 in 1,169 households. The following census in 2011 counted 5,619 people in 1,421 households. The latest census in 2016 showed a population of 6,252 people in 1,833 households.

References 

Cities in Bushehr Province
Populated places in Ganaveh County